Environmental journalism
 Environmental accounting
 Sustainability accounting
 Environmental reports